Muted group theory (MGT), created by Edwin Ardener and Shirley Ardener in 1975, is a communication theory that focuses on how marginalized groups are muted and excluded via the use of language. The main idea of MGT is that "Language serves its creators better than those in other groups who have to learn to use the language as best they can."

The term mutedness refers to a group's inability to express themselves due to this inequity. The theory describes the relationship between a dominant group and its subordinate group(s) as being as follows: 1) the dominant group contributes mostly to the formulation of the language system, including the social norms and vocabulary, and 2) members from the subordinate group(s) have to learn and use the dominant language to express themselves. However, this translation process may result in the loss and distortion of information as the people from subordinate groups cannot articulate their ideas clearly. The dominant group may also ignore the voice of the marginalized group. All these may eventually lead to the mutedness of the subordinate group. Although this theory was initially developed to study the different situations faced by female and male, it can also be applied to any marginalized group that is muted by the inadequacies of their languages.

Overview

Origin

Background 
in 1968, Edwin Ardener pointed out a phenomenon where anthropologists had difficulties reproducing models of the society from women's perspectives, if they (the models) do not conform to those generated by men. 

In 1971, Shirley Ardener cited instances from feminism movements to articulate how women as a muted group used body symbolism to justify their actions and arguments in her article "Sexual Insult and Female Militancy".

In 1975, Shirley Ardener reprinted Edwin's paper "The Interpretation of Ritual,1972" and included her sexual insult text in the book "Perceiving Women", for which she wrote an intro.

Genesis
Muted Group Theory was firstly developed in the field of cultural anthropology by the British anthropologist, Edwin Ardener. The first formulation of MGT emerges from one of Edwin Ardener's short essays, entitled "Belief and the Problem of Women," in which Ardener explored the "problem" of women. In social anthropology, the problem of women is divided in two parts: technical and analytical. The technical problem is that although half of the population and society is technically made up of women, ethnographers have often ignored this half of the population. Ardener writes that "those trained in ethnography evidently have a bias towards the kinds of model that men are ready to provide (or to concur in) rather than towards any that women might provide."  He also suggests that the reason behind this is that men tend to give a "bounded model of society" akin to the ones that ethnographers are attracted to.  Therefore, men are those who produce and control symbolic production in a society. This leads to the analytical part of the problem which attempts to answer the question: "[…] if the models of society made by most ethnographers tend to be models derived from the male portion of that society, how does the symbolic weight of the other mass of persons express itself?"

After conducting an experiment with the information in his essay, the results indicated that the male point of view is the dominant point of view in society, which is why it is depicted with a standard solid line in this graph. On the other hand, the female point of view is considered as non-dominant and non-standard, so it falls into the muted category with the broken line. According to Ardener, because male-based understandings of society represent the dominant worldview, certain groups are silenced or muted. He writes: "In these terms if the male perception yields a dominant structure, the female one is a muted structure." As part of the critical approach to the world, Ardener uses MGT to explore the power and societal structure in relation to the dynamism between dominant and subordinated groups. Moreover, Ardener's concept of muted groups does not only apply to women but can also be applied to other non-dominant groups within social structures.

Expansion 
Source

Scholars Cheris Kramerae, Barrie Thorne and Nancy Henley were interested in exploring ways language “defines, deprecates, and ignores women”. They limited their research especially in the gender culture, whereas the Ardeners were applying MGT across different cultures. What they discovered is that "male dominance affects more than just the way sexes speak but the content and structure of the English language. Women are often defined by their relation to men (“Miss/Mrs.” or “Harold’s Widow”) while men have more autonomous varied linguistic status." Thus, Kramerae attributed the series of phenomena to a conception "man-made language" and pointed out that women would be a muted group.

Based on Kramare's work, scholars Anita Taylor and M.J. Hardman observed that there're no concepts that important to women recognized in English naming rules. The language also devlaues concepts that is important to women but not to men. Representations of man-made language can be found in daily social life. For instance, women and men that are of the same social rank are usually addressed by asymmetrical usages of first and last name (women are usually called by first name while men are by the last name); or associations of certain words with women are formed to maintain the social stereotype (sewing, cooking, house chores, etc.).

Key concepts

Mutedness 

Mutedness does not equal silence. Mutedness occurs when people cannot articulate their ideas, regardless of time and space, without changing their language to meet the dominant group's vocabulary. Mutedness results from the lack of power and might lead to being overlooked, muffled, and invisible. As gender communication scholar Cheris Kramarae states, social interaction and communication create the current language structure. Because the latter was mainly built by men, men have an advantage over women. Consequently, women cannot express their thoughts through their own words because their language use is limited by the rules of a man's language. Kramarae states:

"The language of a particular culture does not serve all its speakers equally, for not all speakers contribute in an equal fashion to its formulation. Women (as well as members of other non-dominant groups) are not as free or as able as men are to say what they wish, because the words and the norms for their use have been formulated by the dominant group, men."

As Cowan points out, " 'mutedness' does not refer to the absence of voice but to a kind of distortion where subordinate voices…are allowed to speak but only in the confines of the dominant communication system."

Muted group 
Muted group or subordinated group is relative to the dominant group.  The premise of MGT is that members of the marginalized group(s) would mute themselves without coercion, which based on the fact that the silencing of muted group(s) is a socially shared phenomenon. According to Gerdrin, muting or silencing is a social phenomenon based on the tacit understanding that within a society there are dominant and non-dominant groups. Thus, the muting process presupposes a collective understanding of who is in power and who is not. The discrepancies in power result in the "oppressor" and "the oppressed". Kramarae points out that muted group as "the oppressed" are people who don't have a "public recognized vocabulary" to express their experience. Their failure in articulate their ideas lead to their doubt about "the validity of their experience" and "the legitimacy of their feelings". Kramarae also addresses that gender, race, and class hierarchies, where muted groups, are supported by our "political, educational, religious, legal, and media systems". Due to the lack of power, muted groups are usually at the margin of the society.

The "Muting" Process

Muting Methods 
Several scholars have researched and studied how the "muting" process occurs. According to West and Turner (2019), there are four methods that can cause muting: ridicule, ritual, control and harassment. A central factor that contributes to these silencing methods is the trivialization of the lexicon and speech patterns that is often used to describe female activities.

Ridicule

Houston and Kramarae posit that women have been silenced in many ways by for example ridiculing women's related lexicon, trivializing their opinions, ideas, and concerns, and censoring women's voices. According to the research, women’s voice can be ridiculed even in a medical context.

Ritual

Researchers found that women’s voice can also be censored by social rituals, which advocate the subordination of women. A typical example is wedding ceremony.

Control

Scholars pointed out that many social decisions are controlled by men, including history book contents, mainstream media, communication practices, etc. One typical method to realize men’s control during a conversation between men and women is interruption.

Harassment

Harassment happens in public spaces such as on the street, workplace, or even in educational contexts. It usually would be naturalized by men, and women’s experiences and concerns about harassment would be ignored or despised in the context.

Other than verbal communications mentioned above, nonverbal ones are also considered as means of the “muting” process. Including demeanor, distribution of space, touch, eye contact, and visibility, etc.

Strategies of Resistance 
According to Houston & Kramarae (1991) and Ezster Hargittai & Aaron Shaw (2015), individuals can use the following strategies to avoid the "muting" process: 
 Name the silencing factors, whether it has been men or news agencies. 
 Reclaim, elevate and celebrate women's discourse. 
 Create new words for the language system that are inclusive of marginalized groups and gendered words and experiences. 
 Use media platforms (traditional and new) to give voice to these groups.

Assumptions 
According to Cheris Kramarae, MGT makes three assumptions :

Assumption #1 

The different experiences caused by the division of labor result in the different perceptions that women and men hold towards the world

Using men's words is a disadvantage to women because Kramarae believes that men and women are vastly different and thus will view the world differently from each other. This stems from the distinction between the meanings of the words "sex" and "gender". Kramerae believes that communication between men and women is not on an even level. This is because language is man-made. This makes it easier for men to communicate over women. Symbolic Interactionism Theory believes that "the extent of knowing is the extent of naming." When applied to muted group, this means women have an extreme disadvantage over men because men are the namers.

Assumption #2 

Women find it difficult to articulate their ideas as men's experience are dominant

Kramarae argues that English is a "[hu]man-made language" and that it "embodies the perspectives of the masculine more than the feminine", while supporting "the perceptions of white middle-class males. Men are the standard." In other words, Kramerae argues that men use language to dominate women, so that women's voices become less present, or "muted". Kramarae also explains that men's control over language has produced an abundance of derogatory words for women and their speech patterns. Some of these include names such as "slut", "whore", and "easy lay", along with speech patterns such as "gossiping", "whining", and "bitching". When it comes to words connoting promiscuity, there are fewer male-specific terms and the ones that do exist are seen in a positive/sexual light. These include words such as "stud", "player", and "pimp" (p. 465).  Kramarae suggests these harmful words shape our reality. She believes that "words constantly ignored may eventually come to be unspoken and perhaps even unthought". This can lead women to doubt themselves and the intentions of their feelings. Women are at a disadvantage once again.

Assumption #3 

Women have to go through a translation process when speaking in order to participate in social life

Kramarae says that women need to choose their words carefully in public. According to Kramarae, this is because, "what women want to say and can say best cannot be said easily because the language template is not of their own making." Another example of the male-dominated language Kramarae brings up is that in public speaking, women most often use sports and war analogies (things most women do not usually associate themselves with) in order to relate to their male audiences. This stems from the market being dominated by males for so long. Almost all prominent authors, theorists, and scientists have historically been male. This allows for them to give women the "facts" they should believe about society and life in general. Kramarae also believes that "males have more difficulty than females in understanding what members of the other gender mean." Feminist scholar Dale Spender supports the idea that language, and society in general, is traditionally male-centric. "Masculinity is the unmarked form: the assumption is that the world is male unless proven otherwise. Femininity is the marked form: it is the proof of otherwise." If masculinity, and subsequently language, are unmarked forms, than any marked form must go through a translation process in order to participate in social life.

Applications

Contexts 
Marginalized groups in a given culture or society experience the process of muting in social contexts including but not limited to:

Mass Media 

According to Kramarae, women have been locked out of the publishing business until 1970; thus they lacked influence on mass media and have often been misrepresented in history. The reason behind this lies in the predominance of male gatekeepers, who are defined as editors and other arbiters of a culture who determine which books, essays, poetry, plays, film scripts, etc. will appear in the mass media. Similarly, Pamela Creedon argues that in the mid-70s there is an increase of women in the male-dominated profession of journalism.

In The Status of Women in the U.S. Media 2014, The Women's Media Centre researchers explore the current status of women in the mass media industry. The report compiles 27,000 pieces of content among "20 of the most widely circulated, read, and viewed, and listened TV networks, newspapers, news wires, and online news in the United States." The results show that women (36.1%) are significantly out-numbered by men (63.4%). Although the number of women on TV news broadcasts is generally growing, the misrepresentation of women does not only regard their presence as anchors but also the events that they cover. Several studies show that while men mainly report on "hard" news, women are often relegated to cover "soft" news. Thus, women are often muted in terms of the topics they tend to cover.

Although the Women's Media Centre study is very U.S.-centric, non-dominant groups are often muted even in other country's media landscapes. For example, Aparna Hebbani and Charise-Rose Wills have explored how Muslim women have often been muted in the Australian mass media sphere. Their study shows that women that wear a hijab or burqa are often inaccurately and negatively connoted in Australian mass media. According to the authors, Muslim women represent a muted group and thus cannot entirely incorporate their experiences, views, and perspective in their representation in Australian media. Thus, there is a social hierarchy that is privileging certain groups via Australian mass media. It also shows that although currently muted, this group is attempting to gain a voice in this media landscape by engaging and interacting with members of the dominant culture in order to negotiate their silenced position.

Social Rituals 

There are some conventional stereotypes attached to men and women in society when an individual's behavior deviates from this norm they attain "negative feedback" for this opposition to the norm by their actions. In the case of women, this gets quite complicated as women are told to act in a certain manner, but when they do try and emulate their male counterparts, they are "discriminated" and "discouraged" for acting that way.

Social rituals are another example of a place in which the muting process takes place. Kramarae suggests that many elements within wedding ceremonies place women in a silenced position. For example, the fact that the father of the bride "gives her away" to the groom, that the position of the bride – at the left of the minister – is considered less privileged than the one of the groom, that the groom announces his vows first, and that the groom is asked to kiss the bride, are all factors that contribute to the position of a woman as subordinated to the one of the man.

As Catharine MacKinnon (one of the leading voices in the feminist legal movement ) suggests, the law sees women similarly as men see women. Like language, the legal system has thus been created, defined, and interpreted mostly by men.  In the context of unequal power relations between men and women, MacKinnon proposes new standards to define and evaluate sexual harassment and sex-related issues considered as the consequence of unwanted impositions of sexual requirements. Finley argues that there has been a recent interest in feminist jurisprudence and legal scholarship inspired by the law's failure to see that despite the legal removal of barriers, sexes are not socially equal.

The Workplace 

In 1940s America, women entered the workplace in great numbers while men were at war. However, after the war period, the society did not encourage the participation of women in the workplace, and in this way tried to assert male dominance in the society. Organizations still appear to be male dominated. Women's experiences are often not taken into account in the workplace the way male experiences are. The "structure" is maintained by men who primarily use communication from the male perspective.

Most organization goals are met by the usage of "male-preferential" language, as they tend to focus on aspects such as "economic gain" and "performance improved". The main point of organizational communication is that it can help an employee fulfill their work duties. Women are not able to fulfill these duties using language more relevant to them, so in order to attain success in their workplace, they have to go beyond their natural realm and utilize "male-preferential" language.

One of the ways that women are differentiated can be observed when we take the "performance appraisals" into consideration. What they mainly consist of is reviews that are based on the standards that are more like "masculine" standards. Research points to muted groups having little to no sense of agency, dominant emotions, and can point to the employee’s role in the silencing.

One member of the subordinate group that is also silenced in the workplace are women who face sexual harassment by the dominant group. Many women have a hard time when faced with harassment in a male dominated workplace because they are "the verbal minority". Organizations rarely encourage issues of sexual harassment be discussed openly and call for confidentiality when dealing with complaints. Furthermore, women rarely go through formal channels of reporting sexual harassment for a number of reasons to include: "expecting their compliant to be ignored or trivialized by the male dominant group, fear of not being protected from retaliation, worry that the male dominated hierarchy will 'team up' against them, or that their time will be wasted due to the organizations ineffective sexual harassment policy." Those from the subordinate groups are trusted less than white men in the workplace and in general.

Politics 

Independent parties have emerged since World War II to offer people alternative choices for election. However, most of these parties operate only in "circumscribed regions or with very narrow platforms". Prentice studied the impact of the third party, i.e., candidates from non-major parties, in public debate. He finds out that there have been few studies around third party by 2003 and even though third party candidates are involved in public campaign debates, they remain inarticulate and ignored due to the judgment by "standard of the political rhetoric and worldview of the major parties".

Prentice points out that major parties usually interfere with the free expression of third parties through three ways: "ignoring their claims, appearing confused (verbally or nonverbally) by the claims, or actively attacking the claims made". He also notices that the debate questions are structured in a way that reflects major parties' worldviews, which results in third party's mutedness. In order to participate and articulate their own worldview, third party candidates have to transform their ideas to match the major parties' models through emphasizing the agreements with the majority rather than the differences and sometimes may lead them to make statements that can be misinterpreted.

In an electoral system where career continuity is valued, women candidates are placed at a disadvantaged position competing with their male opponents. Stereotypical opinions like women as default caretakers of domestic business impose disadvantages on women, as they are thought to be incapable of being consistent with their work for family reasons. Disadvantages imposed by deep-rooted stereotypes and how electoral rules orient voters’ predisposition reduce women’s chance of success and render women “muted” in political atmosphere.

Education 

The classroom can be a place where women are muted. Women's education in the United States has progressed over the years, but academia is still male-dominated. Kramarae has raised several suggestions for more inclusive educational environments, such as including "women's humor", "speechlessness", and ways to address the issue of "abusive language". Including more diverse language systems in academia can keep it from being dominated by one way of thinking.

In the classroom, men and women utilize language differently. The bond differently with other members of their gender. Women tend to bond with each other through the process of discussing their problems, while men bond with each other using "playful insults" and "put downs". In the event of classroom discussions, men tend to believe that they are supposed to dominate the class discussion while women avoid dominating the discussions.

Houston believes in order to create a positive reform in education it might be useful to revise the curriculum and lay special stress on "woman-centered communication" education. Women's Studies (WS) has evolved and grown over the years. Today there is greater demand for faculty to be on initiatives such as WS programs, African American Programs, and other programs focused on marginalized groups.

Theology 
Rejection to all religions became a central issue to feminism in the 1970s. This issue has been addressed in many well-known feminist texts, such as Kate Millett’s Sexual Politics and Andrea Dworkin’s Right-Wing Women, the second-wave feminism considered religion as an anti-women force founded by men to subordinate women. According to Sheila Jeffreys, “religion founds men’s authority over women and makes resistance difficult, because fear of divine punishment keeps women in their place.” Such Him power is thus seemed as a “sinful but unchangeable” muting process.

The cultural root of housewife can be contributed by the Christianity religion, for instance. Being a stay-home mother is recognized as a Christian vocation, as women “should realize that her many tasks, caring for children and helping or being obedient to her husband” and consider accomplishing these chores to be a holy job and noble gift given by God. Similar beliefs can also be found in the context of Judaism, where women are confined to the private life sphere. Jewish women in the family are expected to perform domestic duties, such as caring for children and husband. Also, rights of women are circumscribed by religious traditions in terms of marriage and social contacts.

Variables 
According to MGT, the voices of marginalized groups are muted because the factors of individuals do not synchronize with the standards set by dominant groups. These factors include but not limited to:

Language 

According to Kissack, traditionally communication has been constructed within the framework of a male dominated society. Women in corporate organizations are expected to use language associated with women, that is, "female-preferential" language. It has been considered as lower than the "male-preferential" language. The primary difference between the two is "male-preferential" language consists of details such as opinions and facts whereas "female-preferential" language consists mainly of personal details, emotions reflected in the conversations, also there is a great use of adjectives in it. Moreover, according to socialist historian Sheila Rowbotham, language is considered to be a tool manipulated by people of superior social rank to conserve their status quo.

Muted group theory has "recognized that women's voices are muted in Western society so that their experiences are not fully represented in language and has argued that women's experiences merit linguistic recognition". Kramarae states that in order to change muted group status we also need to change dictionaries. Traditional dictionaries rely on the majority of their information to come from male literary sources. These male sources have the power to exclude words important to or created by women. Furthering this idea, Kramarae and Paula Treichler created A Feminist Dictionary with words they believed Merriam-Webster defined on male ideas. For example, the word "Cuckold" is defined as "the husband of an unfaithful wife" in Merriam Webster. However, there is no term for a wife who has an unfaithful husband. She is simply called a wife. Another example Kramarae defined was the word "doll". She defined "doll" as "a toy playmate given to, or made by children". Some adult males continue their childhood by labeling adult female companions "dolls". The feminist dictionary includes up to 2,500 words to emphasize women's linguistic ability and to give women words of empowerment and change their muted status. Long argues that words can shape reality and feelings. She also believes that women can grab opportunities to take up physical and political space if they are given more verbal space.

Sexuality 

LGBT groups are considered marginalized and muted in our society. The dominant groups who "hold privileged positions within society" have developed social norms that marginalize LGBT groups. Although LGBT individuals do not necessarily share the same identity, they share similar experiences of being marginalized by the dominant groups. As Gross notes, "For many oppressed groups the experience of commonality is largely the commonality of their difference from, and oppression by, the dominant culture". In order to function and achieve success within the dominant culture, LGBT groups must adopt certain communication strategies to match the social norms.

Race 

Gloria Ladson-Billings believes that "stories provide the necessary context for understanding, feeling, and interpreting" and argues that voices of dispossessed and marginalized groups such as people of color are muted within the dominant culture. Critical race theorists try to bring the marginalized group's viewpoint to the forefront through an encouragement of "naming one's own reality". Delgado addresses three reasons for "naming one's own reality" in legal discourse: "1) much of 'reality' is socially constructed; 2) stories provide members of outgroups a vehicle for psychic self-preservation; and 3) the exchange of stories from teller to listener can help overcome ethnocentrism and the dysconscious drive or need to view the world in one way".

When it comes to education, critical race theorists argue that the official school curriculum is designed to maintain a "White supremacist master script". As Swartz contends, master scripting sets the standard knowledge for students, which legitimizes "dominant, white, upper-class, male voices" and mutes multiple perspectives. The voices from other non-dominant groups are under control, mastered and can only be heard through reshaping and translation to meet the dominant standard. Therefore, Lasdon-Billing argues that the curriculum should be race-neutral or colorblind, present people of color, and "presume a homogenized 'we' in a celebration of diversity".

Age 
Ageism leads to certain age groups being muted in American society. In particular, the elderly are often ignored and marginalized.

In Muted lives: Older battered women, Carol Seaver discusses how older abused women are silenced because of sexism and ageism. She focuses on issues specific to elderly abused women, not just abused women in general. She argues that this group of domestic abuse survivors faces a specific set of difficulties, "They are silenced by ageist assumptions about them as too resistant and hopeless to change or made invisible by the notion that very frail elders are the only victims of elder abuse." Here, age intersects with gender to create a specific kind of muted group. In Muted groups in health communication policy and practice: The case of older adults in rural and frontier areas, Deborah Ballard-Reisch examines how and why elderly populations in the rural areas of Nevada and Kansas are considered muted health communication groups. Ageism, as well as other factors, result in this community being muted.

Aging populations, as seen in Seaver and Ballard-Reisch's works, can be silenced by stereotypes, such as the idea that the elderly are resistant to change.

Issues of ageism intersect with heterosexism when looking at how aging LGBT community members are silenced. Scholar Maria T. Brown writes, "The exclusion of lesbian, gay, bisexual, and transgender (LGBT) elders from queer and gerontological theories has resulted in the silencing of LGBT older adults and their experiences." Brown claims that the silencing is a "rhetorical move" that excludes the elderly from queer theory and queerness from the field gerontology. This case study is an example of how identities intersect (in this case, being elderly and part of the LGBT community). MGT can apply to both of these identities and intersections.

Disability 
Marcel Calvez argues that, "What makes a social group muted is that claims of its members to participate into social life are discounted and that they have internalised the idea that they are not entitled to raise their voice." By this logic, he says that those with intellectual disabilities are muted. Calvez's study examines the experiences of those with intellectual disabilities, with special attention to the fact these groups are often marginalized and silenced.

Many disabled groups are silenced by the dominant abled group that knowingly or unknowingly exclude them. The means of muting, ridicule, ritual, control, and harassment can all apply to disabled groups. Ableist language, such as use of the pejorative term "retard", can be used to ridicule disabled groups. By bringing attention to the use of pejoratives and how they affect certain communities, disabled individuals and abled allies can raise awareness about their harm.

Extension 
Although the muted group theory has been mainly developed as a feminist theory, it can also be applied to other silenced groups in society.

Mark Orbe’s Makeup 
Mark Orbe, a communication theorist, has suggested that in the U.S. the dominant group consists of white, heterosexual, middle-class, males. Thus, groups that distinguish themselves from the dominant one in terms of race, age, gender, sexual orientation, and economic status can potentially be silenced or muted.

Interethnic Communication  
In African-American communication research: Toward a deeper understanding of interethnic communication (1995) and Constructing co-cultural theory:  An explication of culture, power, and communication (1998), Orbe fleshed out two important extensions of muted group theory:
Muting as described in muted group theory can be applied to many cultural groups.  Orbe stated that research performed by the dominant white European culture has created a view of African-American communication "which promotes the illusion that all African-Americans, regardless of gender, age, class, or sexual orientation, communicate in a similar manner."
There are several ways in which members of a muted group can face their position within the dominant culture.  Orbe identified 26 different ways that members of muted groups can use to face the structures and messages imposed by dominant groups.  For example, individuals can choose to (1) emphasize commonalities and downplay cultural differences, (2) educate others about norms of the muted group, and (3) avoid members of the dominant group. Orbe also suggests that individuals choose one of the 26 different ways based on previous experiences, context, abilities, and perceived costs and rewards.

Therefore, although Kramarae focuses on women's muted voices, she also opens the door to the application of muted group theory to issues beyond gender differences. Orbe not only applies this theoretical framework to a different muted group, i.e. African-Americans, but also contributes by assessing "how individual and small collectives work together to negotiate their muted group status."

Co-cultural Communication 
Orbe regards "interactions among underrepresented and dominant group members" as co-cultural communication. He argues that there are three preferred outcomes in the co-cultural communication process: "assimilation (e.g., becoming integrated into mainstream culture), accommodation (gaining acceptance and space in a society and achieving cultural pluralism without hierarchy), or separation (maintaining a culturally distinct identity in intercultural interactions." He also notes three communication approaches: "nonassertive (when individuals are constrained and nonconfrontational, putting the needs of others first to avoid conflicts), assertive (when individuals express feelings, ideas, and rights in ways that consider the needs of themselves and others), or aggressive (when individuals express feelings, ideas, and rights in ways that ignore the needs of others)." The different combinations of the three preferred outcomes and three communication approaches result in nine communication orientations.

Further, although various groups can be considered as muted within society, silenced and dominant groups can also exist within any group. For example, Anita Taylor and M. J. Hardman posit that feminist movements can also present dominant subgroups that mute other groups within the same movement. Thus, members within oppressed groups can have diverse opinions and one can become dominant and further mute the others.

Radhika Chopra’s Makeup 
Most researchers would consider men as the dominant group in MGT. However, scholars like Radhika Chopra asserted that men can also be part of a muted group when considering the nurturing fathers issue. Chopra pointed out that some discourse of mothering devalued father’s presence as “an absence, in contrast with the hands-on vital involvement of the mother." According to Chopra’s opinion, in the early American colonial period, fathers were quite involved in the nurturance of kids. Therefore, the sex and gender distinction should be taken into consideration when we talk about MGT. Sex is more like a biological category where people are put into male and female, whereas gender is more like a social category based on people’s behaviors and identity of masculinity and femininity.

Critiques 
Edwin Ardener saw that MGT had pragmatic as well as analytical potentials.  Edwin Ardener always maintained that MGT was not only, or even primarily, about women - although women comprised a conspicuous case in point. In fact, he also drew on his personal experience as a sensitive boy among hearty boys in an all-boys London secondary school. As a result of his early encounters with other boys, he identified with other groups in society for whom self-expression was constrained.

Another prominent criticism of MGT is that it assumes all men or women are essentially same in their own groups. The difference is between men and women, not among men or women. Therefore, both groups are misunderstood to some extent.

In addition, Deborah Tannen, the theorist that created Genderlect Theory, criticizes feminist scholars like Kramarae for assuming that men are trying to control women. Tannen acknowledges that differences in male and female communication styles sometimes lead to imbalances of power, but unlike Kramarae, she is willing to assume that the problems are caused primarily  by men and women's different styles. Tannen warns readers that "bad feelings and imputation of bad motives or bad character can come about when there was no intention to dominate, to wield power". Kramerae thinks Tannen's opinion is naïve. She believes men belittle and ignore women whenever they speak out against being muted. She also pointed out that "our political, educational, religious, legal, and media systems support gender, race, and class hierarchies". Both theorists believe muting is involved, but they see it from different standpoints.

What’s more, Carol Gilligan presented another reasoning concerning why women and men perceive “reality” differently. She posited that, instead of men presumably being the dominant sources of languages and voices, it is because women and men have different means of formulating their sense of “self”. According to Gilligan, women’s moral domain is more care-based, which means women perceive the reality based on the relations with others, whereas men forge their identity through separation, focusing on self-assessment and individual achievement. These two approaches eventually lead women and men to construct different understandings of integrity and different senses of reality.

See also
 Spiral of silence
 Standpoint feminism
 Standpoint theory
 Groupthink
 Co-cultural communication theory
 Critical race theory
 Cultural studies

References

1975 introductions
Communication theory
Cultural anthropology
Cultural studies
Feminist theory
Linguistic rights
Social inequality
Sociolinguistics
Translation